Vitaliy Yuriyovych Zakharchenko (Russian: Виталий Юрьевич Захарченко, born 20 January 1963) is a Ukrainian and Russian politician who is a senior consultant at Russia's Rostec state corporation. He previously served as Ukraine's Minister of Internal Affairs from 7 November 2011 until he was suspended from duties by the Ukrainian parliament on 21 February 2014 shortly after signing a decree authorizing the use of live ammunition against protesters. In that position, he was the head of the Ukrainian national police service, the Militsiya. The Council of the European Union sanctioned him effective 6 March 2014 for misuse of public funds and human rights violations (Decision 2014/119/CFSP), and the United States sanctioned him effective 22 December 2015.

Biography
Vitaliy Zakharchenko was born in Kostiantynivka, in the Ukrainian SSR of the Soviet Union. He was graduated from the Riga branch of the Minsk Higher School of Interior of the USSR in 1991. He began his career with the police in the Donetsk Oblast in July 1981. From May 2008 to June 2010 he held leading positions in the State Tax Administration in Poltava Oblast. President Viktor Yanukovych appointed Zakharchenko as head of the State Tax Administration of Ukraine on 25 December 2010. On 7 November 2011 the president appointed him Minister of Internal Affairs, replacing Anatolii Mohyliov who had been named the new Prime Minister of Crimea; simultaneously, Yanukovych appointed Oleksandr Klymenko as head of the State Tax Administration of Ukraine. According to Ukrainian media Zakharchenko is a close friend of President Yanukovych' son, Viktor Viktorovych Yanukovych, though President Yanukovych, through his press service, denied that he appointed individuals to top government positions based on their personal loyalty and closeness to his family rather than qualifications. Since Zakharchenko was an officer of the Interior Ministry, he was not allowed to be a member of a political party.

There is a suspicion that the minister owned the single active golden ore deposit in Muzhievo, Zakarpattia Oblast.

The Ukrainian parliament suspended Zakharchenko from his duties on 21 February 2014 for using violence against protesters in the February 2014 Euromaidan riots. Five days later an arrest warrant was put out for him and he is currently wanted on murder charges. Since then he was last seen in Russia on 13 April 2014 during a joint press conference with Viktor Yanukovych and former Prosecutor General of Ukraine Viktor Pshonka in Rostov-on-Don.

According to Krymedia.ru, on 16 January 2015 Zakharchenko was planning to arrive in Sevastopol for a celebration of establishment of Berkut police anti-riots unit and present his charity fund "Yugo-Vostok" (South-East).

References

External links 

1963 births
Living people
People from Kostiantynivka
Interior ministers of Ukraine
Pro-government people of the Euromaidan
Recipients of the Order of Merit (Ukraine), 3rd class
Generals of the Internal Service (Ukraine)
Fugitives wanted on murder charges
Fugitives wanted by Ukraine
Russian individuals subject to European Union sanctions
Naturalised citizens of Russia